ibb & obb is a puzzle-platform game developed by Sparpweed Games for PlayStation 3 and Microsoft Windows.  It began as Richard Boeser's graduation project and debuted at IndieCade in 2008. The Nintendo Switch version was released on March 5, 2020.

The green creature, ibb, and the pink creature, obb, travel through a world divided by a thin horizon line; on either side of the barrier, everything is inverted and gravity works in opposite directions. The game is focused on cooperative play and the two characters must work closely together to progress through the game.

The intentionally lowercase names of ibb and obb come from the book The Well of Lost Plots by Jasper Fforde, where two "generics" with these names must earn their capital letters by evolving as characters.

Reception 

ibb & obb received positive reviews from critics upon release. On Metacritic, the game holds scores of 83/100 for the Windows version based on 4 reviews, and 78/100 for the PlayStation 3 version based on 16 reviews.

References

External links 
 Official website

2013 video games
Linux games
MacOS games
Nintendo Switch games
Puzzle-platform games
PlayStation Network games
PlayStation 3 games
Windows games
Video games developed in the Netherlands
PhyreEngine games
Cooperative video games